Kavala Football Club, the Athletic Club Kavala, is a Greek professional football club based in the city of Kavala, Macedonia. They compete in the Gamma Ethniki, the third tier of the Greek football league system. The club's home ground is the Anthi Karagianni Stadium.

History
The club was formed in 1965 from the merger of Phillipoi Kavala, Iraklis Kavala and A.E. Kavala.

They have had a few runs in the top division of the Greek League. They were promoted to Alpha Ethniki for the first time in 1969 and stayed up for six years (1970 through 1975). They returned to top division in 1976 and played again for six seasons.

In 1982 the club were relegated to the Beta Ethniki (second tier of Greek football). After 11 years in Beta Ethniki and one year in Gamma Ethniki (third tier – 1988–89) they were promoted to Alpha Ethniki. There "black" period began for the team in which they played only in Beta Ethniki and Gamma Ethniki.

2009–2010 season

In 2009 they signed Miltiadis Sapanis and EURO 2004 winner Fanis Katergiannakis. Kavala were promoted for the first time in 9 years to Greeces top division. In their quest to remain in the top flight they have signed Pepe Reina's back up at Liverpool, Charles Itandje and recently acquired Brazilian Denílson (January 2010 transfer window) a 2002 World Cup Winner. Additional season signings include Craig Moore, Željko Kalac, Ebi Smolarek, Diogo Rincón, Sotiris Leontiou, Serge Dié, Wilson Oruma and Frédéric Mendy. This combined with coach Aad de Mos meant that Kavala set the league alight. They subsequently achieved notable victories in the 2009–2010 season against Iraklis FC, Panionios, AEK FC and Panathinaikos FC.

2010–2011 season
Ending in 6th place, the team entered the transfer season. In July, the Spanish goalkeeper, Javier Lopez Vallejo (who played in Real Zaragoza) was added to the roster. The team's owner sought the new manager throughout Europe and settled on the Serbian coach Dragomir Okuka who lasted until November, when he was replaced by Henryk Kasperczak. In Kasperczak's debut as a coach, Kavala beat AEK, 2–1, in what was considered a very good appearance.

But in March 2011, Kasperczak, retired as the coach of this team, and he was replaced by Ioannis Matzourakis, who was the coach in Kavala FC team in the seasons 1985–1986. Kavala finished 7th and  later faced the threat of relegation to Football League (Greece) due to the match-fixing scandal. After an appeal, the team managed to avoid relegation by starting the new league with 8 points less. On 23 August, however, the Professional Sports Committee stripped both Kavala and Olympiakos Volou from their professional licence and demoted them to the Delta Ethniki.

2011–2012 season
Kavala competed in Delta Ethniki Group 1. They only finished 4th, but were promoted two divisions to the Football League for 2012/13 after it was ruled that their demotion to Delta Ethniki in 2011 was as a result of government intervention and should not have been implemented by the football authorities.

2013–2014 season

Ιn September 2013 Germans investors take the management of Kavala F.C. The agreement provides that the new investors will "catch" and a significant part of its debts to old players.

Indeed, the Germans will be able to buy a majority stake of the shares of FC paying €500,000 clause of the first season and €700,000  for the second, respectively.

Crest
The emblem of the club is the ancient trireme, as architecture engineer Christos Batsis designed it. According to the instigator of the emblem of Kavala, the boat is a trireme, where the oars are the footballers, the cloth the administration and the fancy the fans of the club.
These three elements together lead Kavala to the harbors that are the targets the team puts each time. All of this certainly has to do with the fact that Kavala is a coastal city and its world closely related to the wet element. The original element of the emblem of Kavala was hanging on the door of the design of the late Christos Batsis until he died.

For a while, the emblem contained the then name of the "Puma Nea Kavala Football Club" team.

Stadium

The Anthi Karagianni Municipal Stadium (Greek: Δημοτικό Στάδιο Ανθή Καραγιάννη), formerly the Kavala National Stadium, is a multi-purpose stadium in Kavala, Greece. It is the homebase of Kavala FC. The stadium was built in 1970, and currently has a seating capacity of 10,500. It is named after the paralympic athlete, Anthi Karagianni, who won three silver medals in the 2004 Paralympic Games.

Honours

Domestic

League
Second Division
Winners (4): 1966–67, 1968–69, 1975–76, 1995–96
Runners-up (1): 1993–94
Third Division
Winners (2): 2007–08, 2018–19
Runners-up (2): 1989–90, 2020–21

Cup
Kavala FCA Cup
Winners: 2017–18

Achievements

Greek Cup
Semi-finals: 1964–65, 1994–95, 2009–10

League participation

First Division (19): 1969–1975, 1976–1982, 1994–1995, 1996–2000, 2009–2011
Second Division (23): 1965–1969, 1975–1976, 1982–1989, 1990–1994, 1995–1996, 2000–2001, 2002–2003, 2008–2009, 2012–2014, 2021–2022
Third Division (15): 1989–1990, 2001–2002, 2003–2008, 2014–2021, 2022–present
Fourth Division (1): 2011–2012

Sources:

Recent seasons 

Best position in bold.

Key: 1R = First Round, 2R = Second Round, 3R = Third Round, 4R = Fourth Round, 5R = Fifth Round, GS = Group Stage, QF = Quarter-finals, SF = Semi-finals.

Players

Current squad

Other squad players

Personnel

Coaching Staff

Notable Managers 

The following managers won at least one national trophy when in charge of Kavala F.C.:

Most Serving Managers

Gallery

Record players 

Source:

References

External links
 Official Website

 
Association football clubs established in 1965
1965 establishments in Greece
Sport in Kavala
Football clubs in Eastern Macedonia and Thrace
Multi-sport clubs in Greece
Super League Greece 2 clubs